Oxymirus is the genus of the Lepturinae subfamily in long-horned beetle family.

Species
Oxymirus cursor (Linnaeus, 1758) 
Oxymirus mirabilis (Motschulsky, 1838)

Description
Body is generally black, while elytra are mainly brown. Prothorax has large spikes. Antennae are long and in the males they extend beyond the top of the elytra.

Distribution
Species of the genus Oxymirus are present in most of Europe and in the eastern Palearctic realm.

References

Lepturinae